Gustave Paul Cluseret (13 June 1823 – 22 August 1900) was a French soldier and politician who served as a general in the Union Army during the American Civil War, and Delegate for War during the Paris Commune.

Biography

In the French Army
Cluseret was born on 13 June 1823 in Suresnes, Hauts-de-Seine. In 1841 he entered the Saint-Cyr military academy, and was commissioned in the French Army in 1843. He was made captain of the 23rd Mobile Guard battalion following the February revolution of 1848, and participated in the suppression of the June Days Uprising which was to later earn him hostility in certain socialist quarters. His support for an anti-Bonapartist demonstration on 29 January 1849 saw him demoted from command of his battalion, and he fled to London after Louis-Napoléon Bonaparte's December 1851 coup.

He was reinstated as a lieutenant in early 1853 and took part in several expeditions to Algeria. He served in the Crimean War, and was wounded during the siege of Sebastopol. It was at this time that he acquired the nickname of "Captain Tin Can", derived from his hoarding of canned meat and bread rations at the expense of his troops. He resigned from the army in July 1858.

With Garibaldi's Volunteers
After brief spells in Northern Algeria and New York City he travelled to Naples in 1860 and participated in the foundation of the De Flotte Legion, a French Corps to assist in the fight for Italian unification, of which he was soon given command. The legion was subsequently disbanded into the Piedmontese army and Cluseret lost his colonelship.

In the American Civil War
In 1861 Cluseret returned to America to 'participate in the triumph of freedom'. He served under Fremont and McClellan, and actively lobbied to secure his promotion to the rank of brigadier general, but resigned in March 1863.

Following his resignation he co-founded the New York City-based newspaper New Nation with Fremont, which adopted a radical Republican perspective, criticising Lincoln's gradualist approach to the issue of slavery. After an acrimonious dispute between the two leading to a lawsuit, Cluseret had to pay Fremont a £1,148 fine, although he remained proprietor of the New Nation for a further year.

The Fenian Brotherhood and Reform League
In 1866, the governor of New York, Reuben Fenton, entrusted Cluseret with a mission to organise the Fenian Brotherhood as part of a diversionary plan to undermine British influence in the Mediterranean. He participated in the Fenian Rising of 1867, escaping arrest on the collapse of the movement, but was condemned to death in his absence.

He fled Ireland and arrived in London just after the Reform League's Hyde Park demonstration in 1867. He met a dozen members of the Reform League, including John Bedford Leno, in a private room of the "White Horse" in Rathbone Place. He proposed that they create civil war in England and offered the service of two thousand sworn members of the Fenian body, and that he would act as their leader. John Bedford Leno was the first to reply and denounced the proposal, stating that it would surely lead to their "discomfiture and transportation", and added that the government would surely hear of the plot. During subsequent speeches, Leno noticed that only a matchboard partition divided the room they occupied with another adjoining room, and that voices could be heard the other side. Leno declared his intention to leave at once; the others agreed and the room was soon cleared. The next day the meeting was fully reported in The Times, although Leno's speech had been attributed to George Odgers, who had in fact been the only person to support Cluserat's proposal. John Bedford Leno was fully satisfied with the success the Reform League had met and, being opposed to unnecessary violence, bitterly opposed the interference of Cluseret, as did most of the other members of the Reform League. Cluseret's "call to arms" was rejected and he left England for Paris.

Paris Commune
He soon incurred the wrath of the French authorities, serving two months at Sainte-Pélagie Prison for an antimilitarist article published in his newly founded newspaper L'Art. At this time he met several members of the International Workingmen's Association. Although he claimed to have had an interest in socialist ideas since 1848, it appears he did not join the International Workingmen's Association until his detainment, although he later claimed to have been a member since 1865. He made a brief return to America to avoid further imprisonment, arriving back in France upon the proclamation of the Third Republic in 1870.

After his initial attempts to obtain a commission in the French army were refused he set to work to organize the social revolution, first at Lyon and afterwards at Marseilles. Mikhail Bakunin placed much of the blame for the failure of the Lyon Commune revolution on Cluseret's refusal to arm the local volunteers. On the news of the Communard rising of 18 March 1871 he hastened to Paris, where he was appointed Delegate of War by the Commune's Executive Commission. He quickly set about reorganising the National Guard, but his attempts to introduce a centralised militarism led to friction with the federalist Central Committee who withdrew their willing co-operation, and routinely censored his proclamations. On 16 April he was elected a member of the commune, and subsequently reelected its Delegate of War. Disagreements with the other leaders of the Commune led to his arrest on 1 May, on a false charge of betraying the cause. On 21 May he appeared before an ad hoc court and was acquitted. During the occupation of Paris by the Versailles troops he hid at a priest's house, and in November left the city disguised as a priest and crossed into Belgium and from there onto Switzerland where he stayed until 1877. Cluseret published his Mémoires (of the Commune) at Paris in 1887–88.

After the Commune
Following the suppression of the Commune many Communards fled to Geneva. This allowed Cluseret to remain politically active although he was dogged with allegations of being a Prussian spy. His apparently comfortable living conditions were interpreted as a 
give-away. His time in Geneva was however largely uneventful and with new adventure in mind, he departed for the Ottoman Empire in late September 1877 intent on recruiting volunteers to found a republic in Turkey. After several months travelling through the Balkans, Cluseret made it to Constantinople, but little is known of his involvement in the Russo-Turkish war.

He made a brief return to France in 1880 following the amnesty offered to Communards, but again had to flee, this time for penning an article critical of General Ernest Courtot de Cissey. He returned to Constantinople where he stayed until 1886, making a living as an artist and porcelain maker, and providing the US government with a report on Turkish cotton.

After his return to France he settled in Hyères, a town near Toulon. In 1888, 1889, 1893 and 1898 he was returned to the Chamber of Deputies as a socialist by the electorate of Toulon, but forfeiting his alliance with the Guesdists in 1889. This commenced his steady drift away from socialism, leaving the International Workingmen's Association in 1893, and siding with the anti-Dreyfusards during the Dreyfus Affair. From this point on, he consistently emphasised nationalist, over socialist perspectives, and regularly engaged in increasingly anti-Semitic diatribes.

Cluseret died on 22 August 1900.

See also

List of American Civil War generals (Union)

References

 
 The Aftermath with Autobiography of the Author (John Bedford Leno published By Reeves & Turner, London 1892)

1823 births
1900 deaths
Communards
French Army officers
French socialists
Members of the Irish Republican Brotherhood
People from Suresnes
People of the Fenian Rising
Union Army generals